Master and Mistress (German: Herr Meister und Frau Meisterin) is a 1928 German silent film directed by Alfred Theodor Mann and starring Hans Albers, Maly Delschaft and Carl de Vogt.

The film's art direction was by Heinrich Richter.

Cast
 Hans Albers as Arthur Burger  
 Maly Delschaft as Elly Nagel  
 Carl de Vogt as Robert 
 Carl Auen as Kunstschmied Wenzel  
 Robert Garrison
 Philipp Manning as Fritz Burger  
 Albert Paulig 
 Eduard von Winterstein 
 Ida Wüst as Witwe Frank

References

Bibliography
 Alfred Krautz. International directory of cinematographers, set- and costume designers in film, Volume 4. Saur, 1984.

External links

1928 films
Films of the Weimar Republic
German silent feature films
1928 drama films
German drama films
German black-and-white films
Silent drama films
1920s German films